Philippe Hervieu is a French politician and a member of The Greens-Europe Écologie.

Hervieu is a regional Vice-President in Burgundy, a region of France. In 2009, he was selected to be the candidate of the Greens-Europe Écologie in Burgundy for the 2010 regional elections.

References

Year of birth missing (living people)
Living people
French politicians
Place of birth missing (living people)